Gazi Pir (also called Ghazi Pir, Gaji Pir, Barkhan Gaji or Gaji Saheb) was a Bengali (Muslim) Ghazi and pir (warrior saint) who lived in the 12th or 13th century during the spread of Islam in Bengal. He was known for his power over dangerous animals and controlling the natural elements. As the new local Muslim population of southern Bengal were settling in the dense forests of the Ganges delta, these were important qualities. His life is shown on the "Gazi Scroll", a scroll with 54 paintings from circa 1800, which is currently in the British Museum in London, England.

In the villages of the Sundarbans jungles, Gazi Pir is worshiped alongside the Bonbibi and the Hindu Dakshin Rai, to ask for protection from tigers. According to the legends, Bonbibi taught that everyone is equal, no matter the caste or religion that one has, and that they should live in harmony with nature.

Kolkata memorial

Rani Rasmani, who created the Dakshineswar Kali Temple in Kolkata in 1847, saw Gazi Pir in a dream. In this dream he instructed her to construct a shrine for him under a peepal tree which is located outside what is now the riverside gate of Belur Math, which was built in the early 20th century. Ramakrishna Paramahansa used to offer "sinni" at this memorial.

See also
 Bonbibi
Ghazi Saiyyad Salar Masud
Interfaith dialogue
Mosque City of Bagerhat

References

Further reading
 
 

Indian Islamic religious leaders
Bengali Muslims
Ramakrishna
Bengali Sufi saints
Bengali culture
Sundarbans
13th-century Bengalis